Bengal tigers (Panthera tigris tigris) are a subspecies of the tiger family.

Bengal tigers may also refer to:
Royal Leicestershire Regiment, a line infantry regiment of the British Army
Bengal Tigers, a cricket team in the Indian Celebrity Cricket League
Bengal Tigers, a cricket team in the T10 League

See also
Bengal tiger (disambiguation)
Royal Bengal Tigers (sports team)